Vilmos Éden (22 September 1914 – 6 September 1984) was a Hungarian rower. He competed at the 1936 Summer Olympics in Berlin with the men's coxed four where they came fifth.

References

1914 births
1984 deaths
Hungarian male rowers
Olympic rowers of Hungary
Rowers at the 1936 Summer Olympics
People from Vecsés
European Rowing Championships medalists
Sportspeople from Pest County